Mella (known as such also in Italian and in Latin) is a river in Northern Italy, a tributary of Oglio. The largest city the Mella flows through is Brescia. The upper valley of the Mella, upstream from Brescia, is known as Val Trompia.

References

External links

Rivers of the Province of Brescia
Rivers of Italy